The flag of the Georgian Soviet Socialist Republic was adopted by the Georgian SSR on April 11, 1951.

It was the only Union Republic flag in which the hammer and sickle was not gold in colour.

History
Before 1937 the flag was red with the Georgian characters სსსრ (SSSR) in gold in the top-left corner.

Between 1922 and 1937, the flag was red, with the Cyrillic characters ССРГ (SSRG) in the top left-hand corner.

Between 1937 and the adoption of the above flag in the 1940s, the flag was red, with the Georgian characters საქართველოს სსრ (Sakartvelos SSR) in gold in the top-left corner.

The 1951 flag fell into disuse in November 1990 when the flag based on the Democratic Republic of Georgia was introduced until the dissolution of the Soviet Union.

See also
 Flag of the Soviet Union
 Coat of arms of the Georgian SSR
 Flag of Georgia

References

External links
Georgia in the Soviet Union (flag)
Georgia in the Soviet Union (early flags)

Flags introduced in 1951
Georgian Soviet Socialist Republic
Georgian Soviet Socialist Republic
National symbols of Georgia (country)

de:Flagge Georgiens#Geschichte